Hair is the cast recording of the original, Off-Broadway cast of the musical Hair: An American Tribal Love-Rock Musical. It was released in 1967 by RCA Victor. Hair premiered Off-Broadway at the Public Theater on October 17, 1967, and the cast album was recorded two weeks later.  The lead roles were played by Walker Daniels as Claude, Gerome Ragni as Berger, Jill O'Hara as Sheila, Steve Dean as Woof, Arnold Wilkerson as Hud, Sally Eaton as Jeanie and Shelley Plimpton as Crissy.

In the Off-Broadway version of Hair, the lead role of Claude had been written as a space alien who aspires to be a cinematic director.  This was changed for the Broadway production.  This Off-Broadway recording includes the songs "Exanaplanetooch" and "Climax," which were cut from the Broadway production.  The reviewer for Allmusic.com criticized Ragni's and Eaton's vocals but praised Plimpton. When it was released on CD as a bonus disc to the Broadway album, it also included three songs that were in the show, but not on the original LP: "Opening", "Red Blue And White" (the future "Don't Put It Down") and the finale "Sentimental Ending", plus an interview with composer Galt McDermot.

Track listing 
Music by Galt MacDermot and lyrics by Gerome Ragni and James Rado:
 "Aint Got No" 3:04
 "I Got Life" 3:27
 "Air" 3:33
 "Going Down" 2:34
 "Hair" 3:23
 "Dead End"  2:59
 "Frank Mills" 4:23
 "Hare Krishna" 4:29
 "Where Do I Go" 2:52
 "Electric Blues" 2:41
 "Easy to Be Hard" 2:41
 "Manchester" 2:41
 "White Boys" 2:41
 "Black Boys" 2:41
 "Walking In Space" 2:41
 "Aquarius" 2:41
 "Good Morning Starshine" 2:41
 "Exanaplanetooch" 2:41
 "The Climax" 2:41

Notes

See also
Hair (Original Broadway Cast Recording)
The Public Theater
Cheetah nightclub
Hair: Original Soundtrack Recording

References
 Horn, Barbara Lee. The Age of Hair: Evolution and the Impact of Broadway's First Rock Musical (New York, 1991)

External links
Hair Off-Broadway production at BroadwayWorld.com

Cast recordings
1967 albums
RCA Victor soundtracks